(SS) is a name used by two different Swedish limited companies operating public transport in Stockholm, the capital city of Sweden.

The first company was founded in 1915 and owned by the City of Stockholm to coordinate and operate public transport within the City.

Overview 

Traffic with horse-drawn trams began in 1877 with the privately owned  ( Stockholm's New Tramway Company, SNS) and it gained a concession to operate trams on the streets of Stockholm for 40 years.

The city-owned  was created in 1915 with the aim to coordinate and making the two separate networks more efficient. The  network was taken over in 1917 and  would follow in 1918. Although the two networks had merged they would not be connected until 1922.

In addition to trams, motorbuses and the metro, SS once operated a large trolleybus system from 1941 until 1964. The Stockholm City Council decided in 1957 to suspend the tramway and the last five lines (4, 6, 7, 8 and 10) that remained in the City Centre were closed in conjunction with the switch to right-hand side traffic in September 1967.

In 1987 a new company with the name  was created by the Swedish Tramway Society to take care of the traffic on the then forthcoming .  accepted the re-use of its old name and logotype.

During this period the two tramways will be connected.

See also 

 Public transport in Stockholm
 Stockholm Metro
 Trams in Stockholm

References

External links 
 

Rail transport in Stockholm
Public transport companies in Sweden
Tram transport in Sweden
Railway companies established in 1915
Railway companies established in 1987
Swedish companies established in 1915
Swedish companies disestablished in 1987